Delaire may refer to:

 Delaire, Delaware, an unincorporated community
 Bernard Delaire (1899-2007), French naval veteran of the First World War
 Jean Delaire (1923–2022), French orthodontist
 Ryan Delaire (born 1992), American football defensive end

See also
 Del Aire, California, a census-designated place
 Laire, a commune in the Doubs department in the Bourgogne-Franche-Comté region in eastern France
 

Surnames of French origin